Wilisch may refer to:

Wilisch (river), of Saxony, Germany
Wilisch (mountain), in Saxony, Germany